Laz is a commune in the Finistère department of Brittany in north-western France.

Geography
The commune is situated at the heart of a hilly and forest-covered region called the Montagnes Noires (black mountains) which extends for approximately 30 kilometres between the communes of Gourin to the east and Gouezec in the west.

The population of the commune is quite scattered, forming small settlements that could be considered as hamlets. Laz offers exceptional scenic outlooks over the valley of the Odet to the south and the canalized Aulne river and its serene locks to the north.

Map

Economy
Agricultural development was held back by the French revolution and the subsequent royalist revolt, combined with poor soil conditions. The commune started to grow in the middle of the 19th century, when the use of fertiliser and other new techniques allowed the land to be brought into full agricultural use.

Population
Inhabitants of Laz are called in French Laziens.

See also
Communes of the Finistère department
Listing of the works of the atelier of the Maître de Tronoën
Listing of the works of the Maître de Laz

References

External links

Official website 

 Laz Comité d'Animation (events committee) 
Mayors of Finistère Association 

Communes of Finistère